This article contains information about the literary events and publications of 1722.

Events
January 27 – Daniel Defoe's novel Moll Flanders is published anonymously in London under its full title: The Fortunes and Misfortunes of the Famous Moll Flanders, &c. Who was Born in Newgate, and during a Life of continu'd Variety for Threescore Years, besides her Childhood, was Twelve Year a Whore, five times a Wife (whereof once to her own Brother), Twelve Year a Thief, Eight Year a Transported Felon in Virginia, at last grew Rich, liv'd Honest, and died a Penitent. Written from her own Memorandums.
March – Defoe's A Journal of the Plague Year is published under the initials H. F., purporting to be an eyewitness account of the Great Plague of London in 1665.
August 24 – Francis Atterbury, Bishop of Rochester, is arrested in his deanery and confined in the Tower of London, accused of leading the Jacobite "Atterbury Plot" in support of the pretender to the British throne, James Francis Edward Stuart of the House of Stuart.
September–October – Voltaire and Jean-Baptiste Rousseau meet and quarrel at Brussels.
September 23 – Lille Grønnegade Theatre opens in Copenhagen, the first Danish-language theater open to the public. The company consists of immigrant French actors who previously worked in the Danish royal theatre, with Ludvig Holberg as house dramatist. The comedies he writes for them this year include Jean de France.
October 11 – Ten-year-old Jean-Jacques Rousseau is abandoned by his father, Isaac, who flees Geneva to avoid prosecution.
November 7 – Sir Richard Steele's "sentimental comedy" The Conscious Lovers (loosely based on Terence) opens at the Theatre Royal, Drury Lane, London with an initial run of eighteen consecutive nights.
December – Defoe's picaresque novel Colonel Jack, sharing many plot elements with Moll Flanders, is published.
Construction of a new building for the Hof-Bibliothek ("Imperial Library") in Vienna, the modern-day Austrian National Library, begins.
Edmund Bolton's Hypercritica is published, a century after it was written.
Sharafuddin Ali Yazdi's Zafar Nama ("History of Timur", 1425) is published in a French translation by François Pétis de la Croix (d. 1713).
William Wood (ironmaster) commences the minting (in London) of copper halfpence and farthings under patent for circulation in Ireland which will be the subject of the first of Jonathan Swift's Drapier's Letters.

New books

Prose
Penelope Aubin (fiction)
The Life and Amorous Adventures of Lucinda
The Noble Slaves
Phanuel Bacon – The Kite
Daniel Bellamy – The Cambro-Britannic Engineer
Thomas Cooke – Marlborough (written after his death)
Samuel Croxall – Fables of Aesop and Others, newly done into English with an Application to each Fable
Daniel Defoe
Moll Flanders
A Journal of the Plague Year
Colonel Jack
Due Preparations for the Plague
Religious Courtship
John Dennis – A Defence of Sir Fopling Flutter
Johann Georg Gichtel – Theosophia Practica
William Hamilton – The Life and Heroick Actions of the Renoun'd Sir William Wallace
Eliza Haywood – The British Recluse (fiction)
Hildebrand Jacob – Bedlam
Allan Ramsay – Fables and Tales
Jean de la Roque – Voyage en Syrie et au mont Liban
Sir Charles Sedley – Works
William Sewel – The History of the Rise, Increase, and Progress of the Christian People Called Quakers
Jonathan Swift – A Satirical Elegy on the Death of a Late Famous General (satire on Marlborough, written before his death)
Matthew Tindal – A Defence of Our Present Happy Establishment
Isaac Watts – Death and Heaven
William Wollaston – The Religion of Nature Delineated
Antonio de Zamora – Comedias nuevas

Children
Samuel Croxall – Fables of Aesop and Others

Drama
Henry Carey – Hanging and Marriage
Susanna Centlivre – The Artifice
Ludvig Holberg
Jean de France eller Hans Frandsen
Jeppe paa Bjerget eller den forvandlede Bonde (Jeppe of the Hill, or The Transformed Peasant)
Mester Gert Westphaler
Den Politiske Kandestøber (The Political Tinker)
Den Vægelsindede (The Weathervane)
Pierre de Marivaux – La Surprise de l'amour
Ambrose Philips – The Briton
 William Phillips – Hibernia Freed
Archibald Pitcairne – The Assembly, or Scotch Reformation
Richard Steele – The Conscious Lovers
James Sterling – The Rival Generals
John Sturmy – 
 The Compromise
 Love and Duty
 John Williams – Richmond Wells

Poetry

Thomas Parnell – Poems on Several Occasions
Elizabeth Thomas – Miscellany Poems on Several Subjects

Births
February 24 – John Burgoyne, English dramatist, army officer and politician (died 1792)
February 26 – Mary Leapor, English working-class poet (died 1746)
April – Joseph Warton, English poet and critic (died 1800)
April 11 – Christopher Smart, English poet (died 1771)
September 22 – John Home, Scottish dramatist (died 1808)
October 4 – Dominic Schram or Schramm, German theologian (died 1797)
Unknown dates
John Brown of Haddington, Scottish theologian (died 1787)
Waris Shah, Punjabi Muslim poet (died 1798)

Deaths
January 23 – Henri de Boulainvilliers, French historian (born 1658)
March 11 – John Toland, Irish philosopher (born 1670)
August – Robert Sibbald, Scottish antiquary (born 1641)
September 11 – Johann Michael Heineccius, German theologian (born 1674)
September 18 – André Dacier, French scholar (born 1651)
December 26 – Jan František Beckovský, Czech historian and translator (born 1658)

References

 
Years of the 18th century in literature